The following outline is provided as an overview of and topical guide to actuarial science:

Actuarial science – discipline that applies mathematical and statistical methods to assess risk in the insurance and finance industries.

What type of thing is actuarial science? 
Actuarial science can be described as all of the following:

 An academic discipline – 
 A branch of science – 
 An applied science – 
 A subdiscipline of statistics –

Essence of actuarial science 

Actuarial science
 Actuary
 Actuarial notation

Fields in which actuarial science is applied 
 Mathematical finance
 Insurance, especially:
 Life insurance
 Health insurance
 Human resource consulting

History of actuarial science 

History of actuarial science

General actuarial science concepts

Insurance 
 Health insurance

Life Insurance
 Life insurance
 Life insurer
 Insurable interest
 Insurable risk
 Annuity
 Life annuity
 Perpetuity
 New Business Strain
 Zillmerisation
 Financial reinsurance
 Net premium valuation
 Gross premium valuation
 Embedded value
 European Embedded Value
 Stochastic modelling
 Asset liability modelling

Non-life Insurance
 Property insurance
 Casualty insurance
 Vehicle insurance
 Ruin theory
 Stochastic modelling
 Risk and capital management in non-life insurance

Reinsurance

Reinsurance
 Reinsurer
 Financial reinsurance

Investments & Asset Management
 Dividend yield
 PE ratio
 Bond valuation
 Yield to maturity
 Cost of capital
 Net asset value
 Derivatives

Mathematics of Finance 

Financial mathematics

 Interest
 Time value of money
 Discounting
 Present value
 Future value
 Net present value
 Internal rate of return
 Yield curve
 Yield to maturity
 Effective annual rate (EAR)
 Annual percentage rate (APR)

Mortality
 Force of mortality
 Life table

Pensions

Pensions
 Stochastic modelling

Other 
 Enterprise risk management
 Fictional actuaries

Persons influential in the field of actuarial science 

 List of actuaries

See also 
 List of finance topics
 Index of accounting topics
 List of economics topics

References

External links 

 Additional Actuarial Topics
 Actuarial Science Study Forum
 Actuarial Wiki
 Google Map of Actuarial Science Universities in the US

Professional Organizations/Associations for Actuaries 
 CCA - Conference of Consulting Actuaries
 CAS - Casualty Actuarial Society
 SOA - Society Of Actuaries

actuarial science
actuarial science